Hemoglobinopathy is the medical term for a group of inherited blood disorders and diseases that primarily affect red blood cells. They are single-gene disorders and, in most cases, they are inherited as autosomal co-dominant traits.

There are two main groups: abnormal structural hemoglobin variants caused by mutations in the hemoglobin genes, and the thalassemias, which are caused by an underproduction of otherwise normal hemoglobin molecules. The main structural hemoglobin variants are HbS, HbE and HbC. The main types of thalassemia are alpha-thalassemia and beta thalassemia.

The two conditions may overlap because some conditions which cause abnormalities in hemoglobin proteins  also affect their production.  Some hemoglobin variants do not cause pathology or anemia, and thus are often not classed as hemoglobinopathies.

Hemoglobin structural biology 
Normal human hemoglobins are tetrameric proteins composed of two pairs of globin chains, each of which contains one alpha-like (α-like) chain and one beta-like (β-like) chain. Each globin chain is associated with an iron-containing heme moiety. Throughout life, the synthesis of the alpha-like and the beta-like (also called non-alpha-like) chains is balanced so that their ratio is relatively constant and there is no excess of either type.

The specific alpha and beta-like chains that are incorporated into Hb are highly regulated during development:
 Embryonic Hbs are expressed as early as four to six weeks of embryogenesis and disappear around the eighth week of gestation as they are replaced by fetal Hb. Embryonic Hbs include:
 Hb Gower-1, composed of two ζ globins (zeta globins) and two ε globins (epsilon globins) (ζ2ε2)
 Hb Gower-2, composed of two alpha globins and two epsilon globins (α2ε2)
 Hb Portland, composed of two zeta globins and two gamma globins (ζ2γ2)
 Fetal Hb (Hb F) is produced from approximately eight weeks of gestation through birth and constitutes approximately 80 percent of Hb in the full-term neonate. It declines during the first few months of life and, in the normal state, constitutes <1 percent of total Hb by early childhood. Hb F is composed of two alpha globins and two gamma globins (α2γ2).
 Adult Hb (Hb A) is the predominant Hb in children by six months of age and onward; it constitutes 96-97% of total Hb in individuals without a hemoglobinopathy. It is composed of two alpha globins and two beta globins (α2β2).
 Hb A2 is a minor adult Hb that normally accounts for approximately 2.5-3.5% of total Hb from six months of age onward. It is composed of two alpha globins and two delta globins (α2δ2).

Classification of hemoglobinopathies

A)  Qualitative

Structural abnormalities 
Hb variants: Hb structural variants are qualitative defects that cause a change in the structure (primary, secondary, tertiary, and/or quaternary) of the Hb molecule. The majority of Hb variants do not cause disease and are most commonly discovered either incidentally or through newborn screening. A subset of Hb variants can cause severe disease when inherited in the homozygous or compound heterozygous state in combination with another structural variant or a thalassemia mutation. When clinical consequences occur, they may include anemia due to hemolysis or polycythemia due to alterations in the oxygen affinity of the abnormal Hb. Common examples of hemoglobin variants associated with hemolysis include sickle Hb (Hb S) and Hb C. Hb variants can usually be detected by protein-based assay methods; however, DNA-based methods may be required for variants with ambiguous or unusual results from protein analysis.

The major functional consequences of Hb structural variants can be classified as follows:
 Change in physical properties (solubility): Common beta globin mutations can alter the solubility of the Hb molecule: Hb S polymerizes when deoxygenated and Hb C crystallizes.
 Reduced protein stability (instability): Unstable Hb variants are mutations that cause the Hb molecule to precipitate, spontaneously or upon oxidative stress, resulting in hemolytic anemia. Precipitated, denatured Hb can attach to the inner layer of the plasma membrane of the red blood cell (RBC) and form Heinz bodies.
 Change in oxygen affinity: High or low oxygen affinity Hb molecules are more likely than normal to adopt the relaxed (R, oxy) state or the tense (T, deoxy) state, respectively. High oxygen affinity variants (R state) cause polycythemia (e.g., Hb Chesapeake, Hb Montefiore). Low oxygen affinity variants can cause cyanosis (e.g., Hb Kansas, Hb Beth Israel).
 Oxidation of heme iron: Mutations of the heme binding site, particularly those affecting the conserved proximal or distal histidine residues, can produce M-hemoglobin, in which the iron atom in heme is oxidized from the ferrous (Fe2+) state to the ferric (Fe3+) state, with resultant methemoglobinemia.

Chemical abnormalities
 Methemoglobinemia:
 a condition caused by elevated levels of methemoglobin in the blood. Methaemoglobin is a form of Hb that contains the ferric [Fe3+] form of iron. The affinity for oxygen of ferric iron is impaired. The binding of oxygen to methaemoglobin results in an increased affinity for oxygen in the remaining heme sites that are in ferrous state within the same tetrameric haemoglobin unit.

B)  Quantitative

Production abnormalities 

Copy number variation (e.g., deletion, duplication, insertion) is also a common genetic cause of Hb disorders, and complex rearrangements and globin gene fusions can also occur.
 Thalassemias: Thalassemias are quantitative defects that lead to reduced levels of one type of globin chain, creating an imbalance in the ratio of alpha-like chains to beta-like chains. As noted above, this ratio is normally tightly regulated to prevent excess globin chains of one type from accumulating. The excess chains that fail to incorporate into Hb form non-functional aggregates that precipitate within the RBC. This can lead to premature RBC destruction in the bone marrow (beta thalassemia) and/or in the peripheral blood (alpha thalassemia). Types:
 Alpha
 Beta (Major)
 Beta (Minor)

Hemoglobin variants 
Haemoglobin variant are not necessarily pathological. For example, haemoglobin Valletta and haemoglobin Marseille are two haemoglobin variants which are non-pathological
 HbS
 HbC
 HbE
 Hb Bart's
 Hb D-Punjab
 HbO (Hb O-Arab)
 Hb G-Philadelphia
 Hb H
 Hb Constant Spring
 Hb Hasharon
 Hemoglobin Kenya
 Hb Korle-Bu
 Hb Lepore
 Hb M
 Hb Kansas
 Hb J
 Hb N-Baltimore
 Hb Hope
 Hb Pisa

Electrophoretic migration patterns 

Hemoglobin variants can be detected by gel electrophoresis.

Alkaline electrophoresis 
In general on alkaline electrophoresis in order of increasing mobility are hemoglobins A2, E=O=C, G=D=S=Lepore, F, A, K, J, Bart's, N, I, and H.

In general a sickling test is performed on abnormal hemoglobins migrating in the S location to see if the hemoglobin precipitates in solution of sodium bisulfite.

Acid electrophoresis 
In general on acid electrophoresis in order of increasing mobility are hemoglobins F, A=D=G=E=O=Lepore, S, and C.

This is how abnormal hemoglobin variants are isolated and identified using these two methods.  For example, a Hgb G-Philadelphia would migrate with S on alkaline electrophoresis and would migrate with A on acid electrophoresis, respectively

Evolution

Some hemoglobinopathies (and also related diseases like glucose-6-phosphate dehydrogenase deficiency) seem to have given an evolutionary benefit, especially to heterozygotes, in areas where malaria is endemic. Malaria parasites live inside red blood cells, but subtly disturb normal cellular function. In patients predisposed for rapid clearance of red blood cells, this may lead to early destruction of cells infected with the parasite and increased chance of survival for the carrier of the trait.

Hemoglobin functions:
  Transport of oxygen from the lungs to the tissues: This is due to the peculiar cooperation of the globin chains that allows the molecule to take in more oxygen where there is increased oxygen and to release oxygen in low concentration of oxygen.
 Transport of carbon dioxide from the tissues to the lungs: The end product of tissue metabolism is acidic which increases hydrogen ions in solution. The hydrogen ions combine with bicarbonates to produce water and carbon dioxide. The carbon dioxide is mop up by hemoglobin to favor this reversible reaction.
 Transport of nitric oxide: Nitric oxide is a vasodilator. This assists in the regulation of vascular reaction in times of stress as experienced during inflammation.
Pathology and organic structural abnormalities may lead to any of the following disease processes:
 Anemia due to reduced life span of the red cells of reduced production of the cells e. g. hemoglobin S, C and E.
 Increased oxygen affinity: The red blood cells do not release their oxygen content readily in hypoxic conditions. The bone marrow therefore needs to produce more red blood cells and there is polycythemia.
 Unstable hemoglobins: Red blood cells are easily destroyed under stress and hemolysis occurs with possible jaundice.
 Methemoglobinemia: The iron in the heme portion of hemoglobin is easily oxidised and this reduces the ability of hemoglobin to bind oxygen. More deoxygenated hemoglobin are formed and the blood becomes cyanotic.

References

External links 

Hereditary hemolytic anemias
Disorders of globin and globulin proteins